The following is a partial list of institutions and individuals who are notable and active in the art scene of Portland, Oregon.

Museums
 Museum of Contemporary Craft - Closed in 2016
 Portland Art Museum

Colleges and universities with art programs and or major exhibition programs
 George Fox University
 Lewis & Clark College
 Linfield University
 Northwest Film Center
 Pacific Northwest College of Art
 Portland State University
 Reed College Cooley Gallery

Nonprofit or alternative spaces and other institutions
 Disjecta
 Imago Theatre
 Interstate Firehouse Cultural Center
 Oregon Biennial
 Portland Documentary and Experimental Film Festival
 Portland Institute for Contemporary Art
 Portland Museum of Modern Art
 Powell's Books Basil Hallward Gallery
 Project Grow
 Regional Arts & Culture Council
 Yale Union

Publications/BLOGs
 The Bear Deluxe — art, literature, and environmental magazine
 The Oregonian — daily newspaper of record containing some arts coverage
 PLAZM — art and design magazine
 PORT — dedicated visual art blog with daily art news, interviews and reviews
 The Portland Mercury — weekly newspaper containing some arts coverage
 Portland Tribune — twice-weekly newspaper containing some arts coverage
 Willamette Week — weekly newspaper containing some arts coverage

Curators, critics & writers
 Gordon Gilkey 
 Jeff Jahn
 Kristan Kennedy
 Mack McFarland
 Cris Moss
 Jenene Nagy
 Jonathan Raymond
 Matthew Stadler
 Libby Werbel

Artists
 Cedar Lee (born 1981)
 Brad Adkins (born 1973)
 Dan Attoe (born 1975)
 Damali Ayo (born 1972)
 Lance Bangs (born 1972)
 Becca Bernstein (born 1977)
 Trevor Chowning (born 1972)
 Bruce Conkle
 Tom Cramer
 Jen Delos Reyes
 Richard Diebenkorn (1922-1993)
 Carson Ellis (born 1975)
 Harrell Fletcher (born 1967)
 Laura Fritz
 Matt Groening (born 1954)
 MK Guth (born 1963)
 Sally Haley (1908-2007)
 Susan J. Harlan (born 1950)
 Todd Haynes (born 1961)
 Sean Healy
 Jessica Jackson Hutchins (born 1971)
 Jennifer Jako (born 1973)
 Aaron Flint Jamison (born 1979)
 Chris Johanson (born 1968)
 Maude Kerns (1876-1965)
 Les McClaine (born 1977)
 Mack McFarland
 Matt McCormick (born 1972)
 Carl Morris (1911-1993)
 TJ Norris (born 1965)
 Andy Paiko (born 1977)
 Red 76
 Wendy Red Star (born 1981)
 Jim Riswold (born 1957)
 Stephanie Robison (born 1976)
 Patrick Rock (born 1951)
 Mark Rothko (1903-1970)
 Craig Thompson (born 1975)
 Gus Van Sant (born 1952)
 Marie Watt (born 1967)
 Minor White (1908-1976)
 Jim Warren (born 1949)
 Phyllis Yes (born 1941)

Architects
Pietro Belluschi (1899-1994)
Brad Cloepfil (born 1956)
John Yeon (1910-1994)

See also
 Lists of Oregon-related topics

References

Portland, Oregon
 
Artists
Portland, Oregon
Art in Portland, Oregon